Susan Hooper (born c. 1960) is a British businesswoman.

Early life
Hooper was born circa 1960-1961. She earned bachelor's and master's degrees in international politics and economics from Johns Hopkins University's School of Advanced International Studies (SAIS).

Career
Hooper was CEO of the travel division of Acromas Holdings, which includes Saga Travel, Titan Holidays, and travel division of the AA. Hooper has been managing director of British Gas Residential Services.

Hooper is a non-executive director of Wizz Air, the Department for Exiting the European Union (DExEU), the Rank Group and Affinity Water. In April 2018, Hooper was appointed a non-executive director of Uber.

References

Living people
1960s births
Paul H. Nitze School of Advanced International Studies alumni
British corporate directors
Directors of Uber